Wellawatte-Galkissa electoral district was an electoral district of Sri Lanka between August 1947 and March 1960. The district was named after the suburbs of Wellawatte and Galkissa (Dehiwala-Mount Lavinia) in Colombo, Colombo District, Western Province.

Members of Parliament
Key

Elections

1947 Parliamentary General Election
Results of the 1st parliamentary election held between 23 August 1947 and 20 September 1947 for the district:

1952 Parliamentary General Election
Results of the 2nd parliamentary election held between 24 May 1952 and 30 May 1952 for the district:

1956 Parliamentary General Election
Results of the 3rd parliamentary election held between 5 April 1956 and 10 April 1956 for the district:

References

Former electoral districts of Sri Lanka
Politics of Colombo District